Bayki-Yunusovo (Bayqı-Yunıs) is a rural locality (a village) in Baykibashevsky Selsoviet, Karaidelsky District, Bashkortostan, Russia. The population was 411 as of 2010. There are 9 streets.

Geography 
Bayki-Yunusovo is located 34 km northwest of Karaidel (the district's administrative centre) by road. Tegermenevo is the nearest rural locality.

References 

Rural localities in Karaidelsky District